Ashanti Bush (born 18 August 2002) is an Australian rules footballer playing for Gold Coast in the AFL Women's competition (AFLW).

Bush was born and raised in Wugularr, Northern Territory of indigenous descent, from a Jawoyn (Bagala) regions descended from the Maiawali, Iwaidja and Yolngu people and is from a family of Indigenous Australian artists. She attended primary school there before moving to Darwin to attend boarding school. Bush began playing Australian rules from a young age following her older sister and relative David Wirrpanda and Stephanie Williams, always aspiring to play AFLW. Proving a talent she joined the NT Thunder Academy and later moving to the Gold Coast to join the AFL Suns Academy. To improve her chances of being drafted she followed a proven pathway moving to Melbourne in 2001 to play games with Hawthorn Football Club’s VFLW team before being drafted by the Gold Coast Suns.

Bush was picked by the Gold Coast at number 8 in the 2021 AFL Women's draft. She debuted in 2022 and won the Goal of the Year in her first season for her Round 10 goal.

References

2002 births
Living people
Sportspeople from the Northern Territory
Australian rules footballers from the Northern Territory
Gold Coast Football Club (AFLW) players